Unibas may refer to:

 The University of Basel (German: Universität Basel), Switzerland
 The University of Basilicata (Italian: Università degli Studi della Basilicata), Italy